"Incense and Peppermints" is a song by the Los Angeles-based psychedelic rock band Strawberry Alarm Clock. The song is officially credited as having been written by John S. Carter and Tim Gilbert, although it was based on an instrumental idea by band members Mark Weitz and Ed King. It was released as the A-side of a single in May 1967 by Uni Records and reached the number one position on the Billboard Hot 100, where it stayed for one week before beginning its fall down the charts.  Although the single was released in the United Kingdom it failed to break into the UK Singles Chart. The song was featured in the film Austin Powers: International Man of Mystery.

History
Prior to the release of "Incense and Peppermints," Strawberry Alarm Clock had already issued four singles ("Long Day's Care" b/w "Can't Explain," "My Flash on You" b/w "Fortune Teller," "In the Building" b/w "Hey Joe," and "Heart Full of Rain" b/w "First Plane Home") on All-American Records under the name Thee Sixpence. During recording sessions for "Incense and Peppermints," the Thee Sixpence members expressed a dislike for the song lyrics (which John S. Carter wrote, relying on a rhyming dictionary for the purpose), so the lead vocals were sung by a friend of the band, Greg Munford, who was attending the recording session as a visitor. The regular vocalists in the band were relegated to providing background and harmony vocals on the record. Band members Mark Weitz and Ed King were both denied songwriting credits by producer Frank Slay, despite the fact that the song was, at least partially, built on an instrumental idea by Weitz and King. The songwriting credits went to Carter and to his songwriting partner Tim Gilbert, despite the latter neither writing nor helping to write the song. King would go on to greater fame as a member of the 1970s Southern rock band Lynyrd Skynyrd.

"Incense and Peppermints" initially appeared on the B-side of Thee Sixpence's fifth single, "The Birdman of Alkatrash," released on All-American Records in April 1967. However, local radio stations began playing "Incense and Peppermints" instead of the A-side, and the song began to gain in popularity in and around Los Angeles. Sensing the possibility of a national hit, the Uni Records subsidiary of MCA (now called Universal Music Group) picked up the record for national distribution and the single was re-released in May 1967: this time with "Incense and Peppermints" on the A-side and "The Birdman of Alkatrash" as the B-side. By the time of this second pressing, the band had changed its name to "The Strawberry Alarm Clock" due to the existence of a local group with a name somewhat similar to Thee Sixpence.

"Incense and Peppermints" spent 16 weeks on the Billboard chart, finally reaching the #1 spot for the week ending November 25, 1967.  The single earned a gold disc from the RIAA on December 7, 1967 for sales of one million copies.

Chart performance

Weekly singles charts

Year-end charts

References

External links
 Lyrics of this song
 

1967 debut singles
Billboard Hot 100 number-one singles
Cashbox number-one singles
1967 songs
American psychedelic rock songs
Strawberry Alarm Clock songs
Uni Records singles
MCA Records singles
Songs written by Ed King